The Chamberlain Baronetcy was created for Henry Chamberlain in the Baronetage of the United Kingdom on 22 February 1828.

Chamberlain baronets, of London (1828)

Sir Henry Chamberlain, 1st Baronet (1773 – 31 July 1829)
Sir Henry Chamberlain, 2nd Baronet (2 October 1796 – 8 September 1843)
Sir Henry Orlando Robert Chamberlain, 3rd Baronet (15 December 1828 – 30 December 1870)
Sir Henry Hamilton Erroll Chamberlain, 4th Baronet (22 November 1857 – 28 June 1936)
Sir Henry Wilmot Chamberlain, 5th Baronet (17 May 1899 – 24 December 1980) Extinct on his death.

References

Extinct baronetcies in the Baronetage of the United Kingdom